Bill Homeier (August 31, 1918 Rock Island, Texas – May 5, 2001 Houston, Texas) was an American racecar driver.

He drove in the AAA and USAC Championship Car series, racing in the 1953–1955 and 1958–1960 seasons with 14 starts, including the 1954 and 1960 Indianapolis 500 races. He was a relief driver for Walt Faulkner in the 1955 Indianapolis 500 He finished in the top ten 5 times, with his best finish in 5th position, in 1959 at Sacramento. He holds a unique record from the 1954 Indianapolis 500; he finished in last place, but completed 74 laps, the most for a last place finisher.

Indy 500 results

World Championship career summary
The Indianapolis 500 was part of the FIA World Championship from 1950 through 1960. Drivers competing at Indy during those years were credited with World Championship points and participation. Bill Homeier participated in 3 World Championship races, scoring 1 World Championship point.

References

1918 births
2001 deaths
Indianapolis 500 drivers
People from Colorado County, Texas
Racing drivers from Texas